The Burning River is a river in the Hudson Bay drainage basin in the north of the Unorganized Part of Kenora District in Northwestern Ontario, Canada. The river flows north from an unnamed bog to its mouth as a left tributary of the Fawn River, which flows via the Severn River to Hudson Bay.

See also
List of rivers of Ontario

References

Sources

Rivers of Kenora District
Tributaries of Hudson Bay